Glenn Exum (June 24, 1911 – March 17, 2000) numbers among the premier mountaineers in American climbing history.  Exum is best remembered for ascents in the Teton Range.  In 1931, while only in his teens, Exum was the first to climb the exposed ridge to the summit of Grand Teton which now bears his name. The Exum Ridge remains one of the most popular routes to the summit of Grand Teton.  After traveling Europe and seeing mountain guides there essentially pull their clients up the mountain, Exum, along with his friend Paul Petzoldt, founded a climbing school to teach clients climbing skills to allow them to fully participate in ascending the mountain.  The school they founded, now known as Exum Mountain Guides, still operates today within Grand Teton National Park.

References
Glenn Exum Memorial
A Climber's Guide to the Teton Range
Glenn Exum “Never a Bad Word or a Twisted Rope” A Collection of Climbing Stories by Glenn Exum. Compiled and edited by Charlie Craighead (1998). Published by Grand Teton Natural History Association, Moose, Wyoming.

1911 births
2000 deaths
American mountain climbers